Rafael Wellington Pérez (born 27 April 1985), known as Rafael Wellington or Rafa Wellington, is a Spanish professional footballer who plays for UD Castellonense as a left back.

Honours
Milsami Orhei
 Moldovan Cup (1): 2011–2012
 Moldovan Super Cup (1): 2012

External links
 Profile at zimbru.md
 
 Profile at divizianationala.com 
 Profile at soccerpunter.com
 
 
 Rafael Wellington at publika.md
 Rafael Wellington at HKFA
 
 

1985 births
Living people
Footballers from Córdoba, Spain
Spanish footballers
Association football defenders
Segunda División B players
Tercera División players
Divisiones Regionales de Fútbol players
CD Villanueva players
Real Madrid Castilla footballers
RCD Mallorca B players
CF Villanovense players
Motril CF players
CD Toledo players
Burgos CF footballers
UB Conquense footballers
FC Zimbru Chișinău players
Spanish expatriate footballers
Spanish expatriate sportspeople in Moldova
Spanish expatriate sportspeople in Thailand
Expatriate footballers in Moldova
Expatriate footballers in Thailand